Fulton Financial Corporation is a U.S. regional financial services holding company, headquartered in Lancaster, Pennsylvania.

Fulton Financial Corp. has over $21 billion in assets, operating as Fulton Bank offers over 220 banking centers providing financial services throughout Pennsylvania, Maryland, Delaware, New Jersey and Virginia.

The company engages in five main businesses: Branch Banking, Consumer lending, Commercial Banking, Investment Advisors and Mortgage Services.

Subsidiaries
Banking:
Fulton Bank

Financial services and insurance:
Fulton Financial Advisors, N.A.
Brokerage:
Clermont Wealth Strategies
Payment Solutions:
Global Exchange Group

Merger
In fall 2019, Fulton Bank completed its consolidation of The Columbia Bank in Howard County, Maryland.  Fulton said customers of The Columbia Bank should see minimal changes, other than the bank name.

Complaints 
According to a United States government consumer finance database, the Consumer Financial Protection Bureau (CFPB) has received 64 complaints related to Fulton Financial since May 1, 2017. The complaint subjects include:

 Transaction was not authorized
 Fee problem
 Trouble during payment process
 Problem accessing account
 Funds not received from closed account
 Funds not handled or disbursed as instructed
 Fees charged for closing account
 Money was not available when promised
 Charged too much interest

References

External links
 Fulton Financial Corporation

American companies established in 1882
Banks established in 1882
Companies based in Lancaster, Pennsylvania
Banks based in Pennsylvania
Companies listed on the Nasdaq